The 1911 Copa de Honor Municipalidad de Buenos Aires was the final that decided the champion of the 7th. edition of this National cup of Argentina. In the match, held in River Plate Stadium in Dársena Sur (La Boca) on September 24, 1911, Newell's Old Boys beat Club Atlético Porteño 3–2, winning not only the trophy but its first title in the Argentine top division.

Qualified teams 

Note

Overview 
The 1911 edition was contested by 12 clubs, 7 within Buenos Aires Province and 5 from Liga Rosarina de Football participating in the competition. Playing in a Single-elimination tournament, Porteño beat Club Atlético Provincial (5–2), Gimnasia y Esgrima de Buenos Aires (4–2), qualifying for the final.

On the other hand, Newell's beat Rosario Central (2–1 at Plaza Jewell) and San Isidro 1–0 at its own venue.

The final was held in River Plate Stadium in La Boca on September 24, 1911, where Newell's won 3–2 with goal by Manuel González (2) and Hollamby, who scored on the last minute of the match.

Match details

References

h
h
1911 in Argentine football
Football in Buenos Aires